Neftekamsk Airport  is an airport in Bashkortostan, Russia located 6 km northeast of Neftekamsk. It is a minor airfield.

Google Earth imagery from 2017-07-28 through (at least) 2018-09-10 shows the concrete runway marked with 'X's, indicating it is not operational.  The grass runway remains open

References
RussianAirFields.com

Airports built in the Soviet Union
Airports in Bashkortostan